Oliver Muoto (born 1969) is a Polish-born entrepreneur responsible for co-founding several early stage companies including vFlyer, Epicentric and RandomNoise. Muoto served a number of startup advisory boards including those of eGroups, ActiveTelco, Become.com and MerchantCircle.

Born to a Nigerian father and Polish mother, he moved to Los Angeles in 1988 to enroll at the University of Southern California. He received his bachelor's degree in Industrial and Systems Engineering and minor in Marketing from University of Southern California in 1993 where he was involved in at least two on-campus startups. He moved to Silicon Valley in 1993 to join Coactive Computing.

In 1998, he began working on a project called PalmPoint with Ed Anuff. The project eventually led to the founding of Epicentric. Innovacom Ventures, JP Morgan, ScotiaBank, Bessemer, Autodesk, New Vista Capital, Motorola and others passed on Epicentric before it was acquired by Vignette in 2002.

In 2002, Muoto co-founded vFlyer a provider of marketing solutions aimed at helping online sellers and sales professionals syndicate and distribute their product and service listings more effectively on the web.

He also helped launch PayDemocracy. ActiveTelco (acquired by Tut Systems), and TagWorld (acquired by Viacom/MTV), a social network based in Los Angeles. In 2001, Muoto was also granted a key patent (US Patent # 6,327,628) related to enterprise portal software. He is currently president of Metablocks, social media and web technology solutions provider to the music and entertainment industries.

References

External links 
 http://www.muoto.com/ Personal website
 https://www.linkedin.com/in/muoto/ Linkedin
 FastCompany Article  Portals for the People
 WSJ Article Start-Up Capitalizes on Democracy (with photo)
 CNN Interview PayDemocracy CNN Interview Transcript
 New York Times Article Wanted: A Way to Profit by Simplifying Web Classifieds

1969 births
Living people
USC Viterbi School of Engineering alumni
American computer businesspeople
American people of Nigerian descent
American people of Polish descent